The Tower of London is a novel by William Harrison Ainsworth serially published in 1840. It is a historical romance that describes the history of Lady Jane Grey from her short-lived time as Queen of England to her execution.

Background
During 1840, Ainsworth was busy writing the serial The Tower of London while writing a serial for Guy Fawkes and while planning to start his own magazine. Both novels began their publication in January 1840, with The Tower of London being published on its own until December 1840. Ainsworth celebrated the conclusions of The Tower of London with a large dinner party near the printers of his works, Bradbury and Evans, at the Sussex Hotel. The work was illustrated by George Cruikshank.

Story

The plot begins with Lady Jane Grey, wife of Guilford Dudley and daughter-in-law to the Duke of Northumberland, as she enters the Tower of London on 10 July 1553. Prior to her entrance into the Tower, she ruled as Queen of England for nine days after she and her husband were put on the throne by the Duke of Northumberland. Soon after, Mary I was able to take control of England and sent the Duke to be executed. Dudley, to gain back the kingdom, formed a rebellion, which results in failure and the imprisonment of both himself and his wife. After the imprisonment, Simon Renard, the Spanish Ambassador to England, arranges a marriage between Mary and Philip of Spain to bring a Catholic take over of England.

The events of the book alternate between historical background and the plot of Lady Jane. In Book II, incidents throughout the history of England from William the Conqueror to the 1820 Cato Street Conspiracy are mentioned. The novel returns to Lady Jane busying herself with prayer as she awaits her execution. Her only hope for freedom is to become a Catholic. There are conspiracies over Mary's rule of England, which come from those who supported the imprisoned Lady Jane and also those who wish to put Elizabeth I, the Protestant daughter of Henry VIII, on the throne. However, neither of these two sides succeed before the novel ends, and Lady Jane is executed.

Characters

 Lady Jane Grey
 Lord Guildford Dudley
 John Dudley, 1st Duke of Northumberland
 Mary I of England
 Philip II of Spain
 Xit (Sir Narcissus Le Grand)
 Og, Gog and Magog
 Winwike
 Cuthbert Cholmondeley
 Mistress Cicely
 Lawrence Nightgall
 Elizabeth
 Gunnora Boase
 Gilbert Pot
 Simon Renard
 Mauger, the headsman
 Mistress Placida Paston
 The Duke of Suffolk
 Master Hairun
 Peter Trusbut
 Dame Poentia Trusbut

Illustrations
The novel is illustrated with 40 engravings and 58 woodcuts by Cruikshank. The illustrations depict moments from the story while the woodcuts show off architectural features related to the Tower. Ainsworth was grateful for the illustrations to the novel, and he wrote in the preface that "it was no slight satisfaction to him, that circumstances at length enabled him to carry into effect his favourite project, in conjunction with the inimitable artist whose designs accompany the work."

Themes
The novel begins with a preface which explains: "It has been, for years, the cherished wish of the writer of the following pages, to make the Tower of London – the proudest monument of antiquity, considered with reference to its historical associates, which this country, or any other possess – the groundwork of a romance". He continues by describing his idea for the Tower itself, "Desirous of exhibiting the Tower in its triple light of a palace, a prison, and a fortress, the Author has shaped his story with reference to that end; and he has also endeavoured to contrive such a series of incidents as should naturally introduce every reflect of the old pile – its towers, chapels, halls, chambers, gateways, arches, and draw-bridges – so that no part of it should remain unillustrated."

The focus in the novel is the three aspects of the Tower of London. To further this focus, Ainsworth depicts two crownings, a wedding, executions, and even a siege of the Tower. Lady Jane has her first night at the Tower as the Queen of England, and she visits St John's Chapel, located in the White Tower. Later, she is kept as the Tower's prisoner. Overall, the Tower has gothic elements along with having a connection to the Catholic Church in its architecture. The Tower, in its style, also represented the sublime and the connection with the divine. With these various dimensions to the Tower, there is a connection between The Tower of London and Victor Hugo's Notre Dame de Paris, in their emphasis on architecture and with history.

The architectural descriptions within the novel tend to break up some of the aspects of the plot, but they serve to show how the Tower has changed over time. This transcends the temporal bounds of the plot to connect the origins of the Tower to the 19th century when Ainsworth published the novel. According to literary critic George Worth, "Ainsworth seems constantly to be trying to remind his readers, living in an age of urbanization and industrialization in which historic old landmarks were being swept away or defaced or 'restored' beyond recognition, that they had a heritage, one very large vested in physical structures of one kind or another, and that the heritage [...] might soon be gone beyond recall."

Catholics, in general, were viewed negatively by Ainsworth's contemporary English audience. In particular, Mary had the reputation for seeking the death of people and was dubbed "Bloody Mary". Although Ainsworth disagreed with the Catholic religion, he felt that they were part of an idealised English past, and he sought to describe them neutrally. Of Mary herself, Ainsworth emphasised aspects that made her a decent queen. Although many Catholics in the novel tried to use Mary to push Catholicism in a fanatical manner, Ainsworth introduces Cardinal Pole as a moderating figure who tries to sway Mary away from such views.

Sources
The Tower of London is based on the events following the death of Edward VI. Various groups tried to seize the throne, and Mary I was crowned. This brought about a restoration of Catholicism and the rebellion of Thomas Wyatt. In depicting Mary, Ainsworth tried to overcome the view of her as "Bloody Mary" and any anti-Catholic bigotry. He felt that he could depict her without any bias as he focused on what was known about her knowledge and religious aspects. Ainsworth was accused of sensationalising violence in his novels; for instance critic Richard Church remarked that Ainsworth "brought sensationalism and an atmosphere of the Chamber of Horrors into the historical novel". Despite these assertions, Ainsworth was faithful to the sources he worked from. Most of his information was derived from David Jardine's A Reading on the Use of Torture in the Criminal Law of England (1837), and details such as the use of the Scavenger's Daughter are based on Jardine's description of torture in the Tudor period. By recounting suffering and torture in The Tower of London, Ainsworth made plain the consequences of failed political intrigue in the Tudor period. Jardine notes that members of the nobility were not tortured; Ainsworth overlooks this with the intention of showing that failure in political machinations came at a high price. In this, Ligocki feels that Ainsworth was true to the nature of the Tudor period, reflecting the "cruelty and ruthlessness of the politically ambitious of the age".

Critical response
Edgar Allan Poe believes that "The authorship of this work does a little, and but a little, more credit to Mr. Ainsworth than that of 'Jack Sheppard'. It is in no spirit cavilling that we say it is rarely our lot to review a work more utterly destitute of every ingredient requisite to a good romance".

In 1934, Malcolm Elwin argues, "several of his novels – particularly Tower of London and Old St. Paul's, in spite of the absurd antics of the hero of the latter – have undoubtedly the quality of durability. No writer could hope to surpass either as romantic histories of their particular subject." Leo Mason, in a 1939 article, says that "History through the eyes of romance is the essence of Ainsworth at his best – The Lancashire Witches, Tower of London, Old St. Paul's, are romantic histories and will no doubt endure." Worth, in 1972, explains that Ainsworth "spaces his [architectural] descriptions judiciously throughout the novel in such a way as to heighten the effect of the novel rather than detract from it." In 1975, Nicholas Rance claims that The Tower of London is an "incongruous merging of historical romance and guide book".

The enduring image of the Tower of London as a grim place of torture and imprisonment was largely shaped by the works of 19th-century authors, particularly Ainsworth's novel. Such was its influence in emphasising the Tudor epoch of the Tower's history, in the late 20th century historians R Allen Brown and P Curnow felt it still dominated the public perception of the castle. In their official handbook to the Tower, published in 1986, the noted that "Still an innocent visitor to the place today might be led to suppose by guides and guidebooks, that it was built almost entirely for the Tudor monarchs".

References in popular culture
The book is mentioned in the Victorian children's novel Little Lord Fauntleroy.

Notes

References
 Ainsworth, William Harrison. The Tower of London. Paris: Baudry's European Library, 1841.
 Allen Brown, Reginald; Curnow, P. Tower of London, Greater London: Department of the Environment Official Handbook. London: Her Majesty's Stationery Office, 1986. .
 Carver, Stephen. The Life and Works of the Lancashire Novelist William Harrison Ainsworth, 1805–1882. Lewiston: Edwin Mellen Press, 2003.
 Ellis, S. M. William Harrison Ainsworth and His Friends. 2 Vols. London: Garland Publishing, 1979.
 Elwin, Malcolm. Victorian Wallflowers. London: Jonathan Cape, 1934.
 Impey, Edward; Parnell, Geoffrey. The Tower of London: The Official Illustrated History. London: Merrell Publishers in association with Historic Royal Palaces, 2000. .
 Ligocki, Llewellyn. "Ainsworth's Historical Accuracy Reconsidered", Albion: A Quarterly Journal Concerned with British Studies IV (1972), pp. 23–28.
 Mason, Leo. "William Harrison Ainsworth", The Dickensian XXXV (1939).
 Rance, Nicholas. The Historical Novel and Popular Politics in Nineteenth Century England. London: Vision, 1975.
 Worth, George. William Harrison Ainsworth. New York: Twayne Publishers, 1972.

1840 British novels
Novels set in the 1550s
Novels by William Harrison Ainsworth
Historical novels
Victorian novels
Art by George Cruikshank
Novels first published in serial form
Tower of London
Works originally published in American magazines
Cultural depictions of Lady Jane Grey
Cultural depictions of Lord Guildford Dudley
Cultural depictions of Mary I of England
Novels set in Tudor England
Novels set in London
Cultural depictions of Elizabeth I